Abdoulaye Traore (born 29 November 1974, in Upper Volta) is a retired Burkinabé footballer. He last played as an attacking midfielder for USFAS Bamako.

Career
He having requested for his release from Malaysian Super League side Perak FA.

International career
Traoré was a member of the Burkina Faso national football team.

Clubs
1997-1998    :  USFA Ouagadougou
1998-2000    :  Bani Yas Club
2000-2001    :  ASF Bobo-Dioulasso
2001-2006    :  Bani Yas Club
2006-2007    :  Perak FA
2007-2008 :  USFAS Bamako

External links
 

1974 births
Living people
Burkinabé footballers
Burkina Faso international footballers
1998 African Cup of Nations players
Expatriate footballers in Mali
Expatriate footballers in Malaysia
US des Forces Armées players
Perak F.C. players
Burkinabé expatriate sportspeople in Mali
Burkinabé expatriate sportspeople in Malaysia
Association football midfielders
ASF Bobo Dioulasso players
21st-century Burkinabé people